Reig's montane mouse (Aepeomys reigi) is a species of rodent in the family Cricetidae.
It is found only in Venezuela. It is named after Argentine biologist Osvaldo Reig (1929–1992).

References

Aepeomys
Endemic fauna of Venezuela
Rodents of South America
Mammals of Venezuela
Mammals described in 2001
Taxa named by Osvaldo Reig
Vulnerable animals
Vulnerable biota of South America